The Odd Way Home is a 2013 independent film directed by Rajeev Nirmalakhandan. This drama follows a troubled woman, Maya (Rumer Willis), on the run from an abusive boyfriend, who accidentally robs an old woman and steals a delivery truck, only to find the back of the truck has been converted into a bedroom by Duncan (Chris Marquette), a high-functioning autistic twenty-something.  Through a picaresque road-trip to Duncan's only-living relative, the two develop a friendship and an understanding of what family really is. The film world premiered at the 2013 Austin Film Festival.

Cast

 Rumer Willis as Maya
 Brendan Sexton III as Dave
 Chris Marquette as Duncan
 Veronica Cartwright as Francine
 Marya Beauvais as Kendra Richards
 Bruce Altman as James Richards
 Seth Adkins as Jeff Richards

Release
The Odd Way Home was released on VOD by Breaking Glass Pictures on June 3, 2014.  Many reviews compared the story to Rain Man or the Sundance hit Adam, though the film has a much lower budget than both. Variety said "the pic’s small scale, tight focus and generally low-key tenor lend it an attractive modesty that succeeds in tamping down the more melodramatic moments." The Washington Post noted the film "gets under your skin, thanks mainly to the nuanced performance of Chris Marquette," a feeling echoed by The Village Voice which said Marquette "elevates some ghastly material, bringing a human touch to the script's overripe yet hackneyed dialogue."  The Hollywood Reporter was extremely negative, finding the film "riddled with cliches and hamstrung by a scattered script and often forced performances."  In contrast, the reviews on the website Autism Today have been overwhelmingly positive, with some calling the film "beautifully written and expertly executed" and "The Odd Way Home is a movie that will stay with you for days."

References

External links
 
 

2013 films
American independent films
Films about autism
2010s English-language films
2010s American films